Hawkesbury (East) Airport , located  east of Hawkesbury, Ontario, Canada, is one of three small aerodrome between Ottawa and Montreal on the south shore of the Ottawa River.

See also
 List of airports in the Montreal area

References

Registered aerodromes in Ontario
Hawkesbury, Ontario